Hensman is a surname. Notable people with the surname include:

 Alfred Hensman (1834-1902), Australian politician
 Dave Hensman (born 20th century), Canadian singer-songwriter
 Donald C. Hensman (1924-2002), American architect
 John Hensman (1780-1864), English clergyman
 Mona Hensman (1899-1991), Indian MP
 Savitri Hensman (born 20th century), activist and writer in UK

See also
 Henman (surname)